In chemistry, phi bonds (φ bonds) are covalent chemical bonds, where six lobes of one involved atomic orbital overlap six lobes of the other involved atomic orbital. This overlap leads to the formation of a bonding molecular orbital with three nodal planes which contain the internuclear axis and go through both atoms.

The Greek letter φ in their name refers to f orbitals, since the orbital symmetry of the φ bond is the same as that of the usual (6-lobed) type of f orbital when seen down the bond axis.

There was one possible candidate known in 2005  of a molecule with phi bonding (a U−U bond, in the molecule U2). However, later studies that accounted for spin orbit interactions found that the bonding was only of fourth order. Experimental evidence of existence of phi bonding between a thorium atom and cyclooctatetraene in thorocene has been shown, supported by computational analysis.

References 

Chemical bonding
Hypothetical processes